USS Beagle (IX-112), was an  tanker designated an unclassified miscellaneous vessel. She was the second ship of the United States Navy to be named for the beagle, a breed of small, short-coated hunting hound.

Construction
Her keel was laid down 27 September 1943, under a Maritime Commission (MARCOM) contract, MC hull No. 1901, as the Type T1 tanker David Rittenhouse, by California Shipbuilding Corporation, Terminal Island, Los Angeles, California; launched on 29 October 1943; sponsored by Mrs. Victor Dalton; renamed Beagle and designated IX-111 on 27 October 1943; delivered to the Navy 20 November 1943, and commissioned the same day.

Service history
Following shakedown early in 1944, the tanker moved to the western Pacific. There she transported fuel among the various island groups. Between 13 October and 9 November, Beagle operated in the vicinity of Leyte providing support for the invasion of that island. After that operation, Beagle resumed her more routine fuel supply missions between bases in the Pacific.

Post-war service
After the war ended, she continued those duties in support of American occupation forces in the Far East. The ship headed back to the United States from Eniwetok on 11 March 1946. She transited the Panama Canal on 16 April, and arrived in Norfolk, Virginia, on 30 April. Beagle was decommissioned at Norfolk on 13 June 1946, and was turned over to MARCOM for disposal. Her name was struck from the Navy list on 3 JuIy 1946.

Merchant service
On 14 July 1948, to the Edison Tanker Corporation, Inc., of New York City, the vessel was renamed Edison Skipper. She saw later merchant service under the names George S., Georgios Sideratos, and Maria G.L., before she was scrapped in 1964.

Awards
Beagle earned one battle star for her World War II service.

Notes 

Citations

Bibliography 

Online resources

External links
 

Liberty ships
Ships built in Los Angeles
Armadillo-class tankers
1943 ships